Timofey Mikhailovich Podshivalov (born December 20, 1991), known as The Zakamsky Maniac, is a Russian serial killer who operated in Perm in 2011. He is considered one the worst killers in the history of Perm, although his exact motives remain unknown.

Biography 
Podshivalov had been convicted twice before the murders: in 2005 for brigandage, and on October 28, 2010 for causing grievous bodily harm. In both cases, he received a suspended sentence.

From July 15 to August 28, 2011 in the Kirovsky City District, he killed four people - three homeless and an employee of a construction firm. On the eve of the first murder, on July 14, he had just finished reporting to his probation officer. Podshivalov tried to burn the bodies of his first two victims, but left the bodies of the last two at the crime scene. All the killings were committed with particular cruelty: he beat his injured victims using his hands and feet, sticks, stones and even striking them with a knife and then an ax. Podshivalov also stole a tracksuit and a mobile phone from his last victim.

On August 29, 2011, he was arrested and soon confessed to committing the four murders. During a search of his apartment, the last victim's belongings were located. The forensic psychiatric examination recognized Podshivalov as fully sane and reporting of his actions. Initially, on August 2, 2012, he was acquitted by the jury, but the prosecutor's office appealed the decision through the Supreme Court. The case was sent for reconsideration, and this time, the jury found him guilty, saying that the perpetrator did not deserve leniency. On December 7, 2012, the Perm Regional Court sentenced Timofey Podshivalov to life imprisonment in a special regime colony. The Supreme Court of Russia upheld the sentence, and he was transferred to the prison on Ognenny Ostrov.

See also
 List of Russian serial killers

References

External links 
 Hvatsky, Oleg. Zakamsky maniac sentenced to life imprisonment. Vesti.ru (December 7, 2012). Retrieved June 2, 2013. Archived June 2, 2013

1991 births
Living people
Male serial killers
Outlaws
People from Perm, Russia
Russian people convicted of murder
Russian serial killers